This is a list of University of Sydney people, including notable alumni and staff.

Alumni

Academia
 Dennis A. Ahlburg – former President of Trinity University; dean of the Leeds School of Business at the University of Colorado at Boulder and professor of human resources at Carlson School of Management at the University of Minnesota
 Elizabeth Bannan – educationist awarded the Walter Beavis prize and the Jones medal
 Brian L. Byrne – social scientist known for research in psycholinguistics; Emeritus professor at the University of New England
 Jill Ker Conway – former Vice-President of the University of Toronto and President of Smith College; Visiting Professor in MIT's program in Science, Technology, and Society; director of Nike, Merrill Lynch, and Colgate-Palmolive; chairman of Lend Lease Corporation
 Beverly Derewianka – Emeritus Professor of linguistics at University of Wollongong
 Margaret Gardner – Vice-Chancellor of Monash University
 Michael Halliday – creator of the systemic functional grammar, an internationally influential grammar model
 Frank Lancaster Jones – sociologist known for research on social inequality, social stratification, social mobility, and national identity
 Sir Robert Madgwick  – first Vice-Chancellor of the University of New England; two-term Chairman of the Australian Broadcasting Commission; Director of the Australian Army Education Service during World War II
 Ken Robinson – former head of the Department of Computer Science at the University of New South Wales
 Nicholas Saunders – former Vice-Chancellor of University of Newcastle and former Dean of Medicine of Monash University and Flinders University
 Michael Spence – President and Provost of University College London and former Vice-Chancellor and Principal of University of Sydney
 Sir Brian Windeyer – former dean of the Middlesex Hospital Medical School at the University of London and former Vice-Chancellor of the University of London
 Nicki Packer - Distinguished Professor of Glycoproteomics, Macquarie University

Architecture
 John Andrews – designer of CN Tower, Toronto, Canada, the tallest concrete structure in the world and often listed as one of the seven wonders of the modern world
 Philip Cox  – founder and principal of COX Architecture
 Eleanor Cullis-Hill
 László Peter Kollar – Hungarian-born former Australian architect and academic (Architecture)
 Andrea Nield – first president of Emergency Architects Australia

Business

 Matt Barrie – CEO of Freelancer.com
 David S. Clarke – Chairman of Macquarie Bank (1985–2007)
 Cameron Clyne – CEO of National Australia Bank (2009–2014)
 Matt Comyn – CEO of Commonwealth Bank
 Robyn Denholm – Chairwoman of Tesla, Inc.
 John Grill – Chairman of WorleyParsons
 Angus Harris – Co-CEO of Harris Farm Markets
 Sir David Higgins – Chairman of United Utilities Group
 Fred Hilmer – former director and deputy-chairman of Westfield Group 
 Michael Hintze, Baron Hintze – founder and Executive Chairman of CQS
 Ryan Junee – founder and CEO of Omnisio and Inporia
 Jeni Klugman – former Director of the Human Development Report Office, United Nations Development Programme (UNDP)
 Jim Millner – former Chairman of Washington H. Soul Pattinson
 Allan Moss – Managing Director/CEO of Macquarie Bank (1993–2008)
 John Mulcahy – former CEO of Suncorp-Metway Ltd
 Michael Patsalos-Fox – Chairman of McKinsey & Co in America
 Davina Reichman – business consultant
 Mark Scott – former CEO of Australian Broadcasting Corporation
 Glenn Stevens – Governor of the Reserve Bank of Australia　(2006–2016)
 Matt Sweeny – CEO and co-founder of Flirtey, inventor
 Tom Waterhouse – former CEO of William Hill Australia
 Sir James Wolfensohn – President of the World Bank (1995–2005)

Community activism
 Eva Maria Cox 
 Germaine Greer
 Noel Pearson
 Charles Perkins

Government

Royalty
 Sikhanyiso Dlamini – Princess of Swaziland
 Taufa'ahau Tupou IV – King of Tonga

Governors-General of Australia
 Sir William Deane
 Sir John Kerr

State governors and Territory Administrators
 Dame Marie Bashir (NSW)
 Richard Butler (Tas)
 Peter Coleman (NF)
 Sir Roden Cutler (NSW)
 Tom Pauling (NT)
 Sir James Plimsoll (Tas)
 Sir James Rowland (NSW)

Politicians

Prime Ministers of Australia
 Tony Abbott
 Anthony Albanese
 Sir Edmund Barton
 John Howard
 Sir William McMahon
 Sir Earle Page
 Malcolm Turnbull
 Gough Whitlam

Premiers of New South Wales
 Mike Baird
 Gladys Berejiklian
 Sir Thomas Bavin
 Sir Joseph Carruthers
 John Fahey
 Sir George Fuller
 Nick Greiner
 Morris Iemma
 James McGirr
 Dominic Perrottet
 Nathan Rees
 Sir Eric Willis
 Neville Wran

Federal politicians
 John Anderson
 Sir Garfield Barwick
 Lionel Bowen
 Sir Nigel Bowen
 Sir Percy Spender
 Kerry Bartlett
 Chris Bowen
 Bob Brown
 Ross Cameron
 Peter Coleman
 Craig Emerson
 Laurie Ferguson
 Martin Ferguson
 Jennie George
 Joe Hockey
 Tom Hughes
 Ros Kelly
 Peter King
 Andrew Laming
 Mark Latham
 Robert McClelland
 Daryl Melham
 Tsebin Tchen
 Danna Vale

Australian state and territory politicians
 Clare Martin (NT)
 George Thorn (QLD)

International politicians
 John Horgan – Premier of British Columbia
 Natalie Bennett – Leader of the Green Party of England and Wales
 H. V. Evatt – President of the United Nations General Assembly
 Martin Indyk – former U.S. Ambassador to Israel, special assistant to U.S. President Bill Clinton and senior director of Near East and South Asian Affairs at the United States National Security Council
 Trixie Gardner, Baroness Gardner of Parkes
 Robert May, Baron May of Oxford
 Dave Sharma – youngest ever Australian diplomat, becoming Ambassador to Israel at the age of 36
 Catherine West – Labour Party politician in the United Kingdom
 Akhilesh Yadav – 20th Chief Minister of Uttar Pradesh, India
 Teh Cheang Wan – Minister of National Development, Singapore
 Alvin Tan – Minister of State, Singapore
 Khurelbaatar Chimed – Member of the State Great Hural (Parliament) of Mongolia, Mongolia

Lord mayors of the City of Sydney
 Sir Emmet McDermott
 Nelson Meers
 Clover Moore
 Frank Sartor
 Lucy Turnbull

Public servants
 Tony Cole – thirteenth Secretary of the Department of the Treasury
 Philip Flood – fifth Secretary of the Department of Foreign Affairs and Trade
 Neil McInnes  – intellectual, journalist and senior public servant (Medicine and Physiology; did not graduate)
 Ewart Smith – campaigner against the Australia Card (LLB)

Humanities

Arts
 John Bell – actor, theatre director and theatre impresario
 Rose Byrne – actress
 Alex Cubis – actor
 Somaratne Dissanayake – Sri Lankan film director, screenwriter and producer
 Jacqueline Fernandez – Bahraini–Sri Lankan actress and model who predominantly works in Bollywood, Miss Universe Sri Lanka 2006
 John Flaus – broadcaster, actor, voice talent, anarchist, poet and raconteur
 Ania Freer – documentary filmmaker
 Michael Hannan – composer, pianist, and musicologist
 May Hollinworth – theatre producer and director
 Yvonne Kenny – soprano
 Dolph Lundgren – Swedish actor, filmmaker, and martial artist
 Dame Joan Sutherland – dramatic coloratura soprano
 Kip Williams – director of the Sydney Theatre Company
 Roger Woodward – pianist, composer, conductor
 Anne Boyd – composer, first Australian and first woman appointed Professor of Music at the University of Sydney
 Peter Weir – film director
 Bruce Beresford – film director
 Jane Campion – New Zealand director, producer, and screenwriter
 Christopher Doyle – cinematographer
 Sandy Edwards – photographer
 Charles Firth – comedian
 Tom Gleeson – comedian, radio and television presenter
 Andrew Hansen – comedian, musician and author
 Chas Licciardello – comedian
 Julian Morrow – comedian and television producer
 Craig Reucassel – comedian, radio and television presenter
 Chris Taylor – comedian
 Georgina Wilson – Filipino-British model, actress

History
 Alan Atkinson
 Carl Bridge
 Sir Christopher Clark
 Anne Philomena O'Brien
 John Manning Ward

Journalism
 Phillip Adams
 Bob Ellis
 Elizabeth Fell
 Robert Hughes
 Clive James
 Paul Kelly – Editor-at-Large of The Australian
 Ray Martin
 Richard McGregor
 Jessica Rowe
 Lillian Roxon
 Adam Spencer
 Avani Dias

Literature, writing and poetry
 Millicent Armstrong
 Nikos Athanasou
 Clive Stephen Barry
 Dora Birtles
 Christopher Brennan
 Geraldine Brooks – winner of the Pulitzer Prize for March (2006)
 Dymphna Cusack
 Ursula Dubosarsky
 Kate Grenville
 A. D. Hope – Professor Emeritus of English at Australian National University
 Geoffrey Lehmann
 Jeni Mawter
 Les Murray
 Jennifer Rowe
 Pierre Ryckmans (Simon Leys)
 Kimberley Starr
 Dominic Knight
 Margaret Clunies Ross – McCaughey Professor of English and Early English Literature, Director of the Centre for Medieval Studies at the University of Sydney
 Niall Lucy
 Germaine Greer – writer and public intellectual

Philosophy
 David Malet Armstrong
 Stephen Hetherington
 Peter Godfrey-Smith
 J. L. Mackie
 John Passmore
 Wesley Wildman

Law

 Sir Robert Garran
 Sir Edmund Barton
 Sir Garfield Barwick
 Tom Bathurst
 Virginia Bell
 Sir Maurice Byers
 Susan Crennan
 Sir William Portus Cullen
 Sir William Deane
 H. V. Evatt
 Mary Gaudron
 Murray Gleeson
 Sir Samuel Griffith
 William Gummow
 Sir Leslie James Herron
 Dyson Heydon
 Sir Kenneth Jacobs
 Sir Lawrence Jackson
 Sir Frederick Richard Jordan
 Sir John Kerr
 Michael Kirby
 Sir Frank Kitto
 Hugh Macrossan
 Sir Alan Mansfield
 Sir Anthony Mason
 Michael McHugh
 Sir Edward McTiernan
 Lionel Murphy
 Richard O'Connor
 Albert Piddington
 Sir George Rich
 Sir Percy Spender
 James Spigelman
 Sir Kenneth Whistler Street
 Sir Laurence Whistler Street
 Sir Philip Whistler Street
 Sir Alan Taylor
 Sir Cyril Walsh
 Sir Dudley Williams
 Sir Victor Windeyer

Other legal professionals
 Hugh Atkin –  lawyer, former Tipstaff at the Supreme Court of New South Wales
 John Davies – Judge of the United States District Court
 Marcus Einfeld – Judge of the Federal Court of Australia
 Geoffrey Robertson – international human rights lawyer
 Charles Waterstreet – criminal defence lawyer, writer and producer

Military

 Lieutenant General Sir Frank Berryman
 Major-General John Broadbent  
 Major-General Paul Brereton – Head Cadet, Reserve and Employer Support Division
 Lieutenant General Sir Mervyn Brogan – Chief of the General Staff
 Brigadier Sir Frederick Oliver Chilton – led the Sydney Anzac Day March in his 100th year
 Roden Cutler – Victoria Cross recipient
 Major-General Sir Ivan Dougherty
 Major-General W B "Digger" James – Director-General of Army Medical Services
 Lieutenant General Sir Carl Jess
 Captain Gordon Grimsley King – commando leader awarded the Distinguished Service Order for action at the Battle of Kaiapit
 Lieutenant General James Legge – Chief of the General Staff
 Percy Storkey – Victoria Cross recipient
 Major General Mervyn Tan – Chief of Air Force, Republic of Singapore Air Force
 Major-General Sir Victor Windeyer

Religious leaders

 Leo Ash – Bishop of Rockhampton
 Neville Chynoweth – Bishop of Gippsland
 Geoffrey Cranswick – Bishop of Tasmania
 George Cranswick – Bishop of Gippsland
 Hubert Cunliffe-Jones – former chairman of the Congregational Union of England and Wales
 Edwin Davidson – Bishop of Gippsland
 Glenn Davies – Archbishop of Sydney
 Anthony Fisher – Archbishop of Sydney
 Robert Forsyth – Bishop of South Sydney
 David Garnsey – Bishop of Gippsland
 Eric Gowing – Bishop of Auckland
 Arthur Green – Bishop of Ballarat
 William Hilliard – Bishop of Nelson
 Peter Jensen – Archbishop of Sydney
 Clive Kerle – Bishop of Armidale
 Sir Marcus Loane – Archbishop of Sydney
 Henry Newton – Bishop of New Guinea
 Anthony Howard Nichols – Bishop of North West Australia
 Donald Robinson – Archbishop of Sydney
 John Satterthwaite – Bishop of Gibraltar, Bishop of Fulham
 Ian Shevill – Bishop of Newcastle
 Father Joseph Patrick Slattery, CM – physicist, radiologist, pioneer in the field of radiography in Australia
 Peter Watson – Archbishop of Melbourne
 William Wright – Bishop of Maitland-Newcastle

Sciences

 Brian Anderson – former President of the Australian Academy of Science
 Vanessa Barrs – feline researcher
 David Craig
 Robert May, Baron May of Oxford – former president of The Royal Society; Chief Scientific Adviser to HM Government
 Sir Gustav Nossal
 Jim Peacock – former President of Australian Academy of Science
 Michael Pitman – former Chief Scientist of Australia
 Elizabeth Tasker – fire ecologist

Astronauts and astronomy
 Ruby Payne-Scott – first to use radio interferometry
 Bernard Mills – developed the Mills Cross Telescope and Molonglo Observatory Synthesis Telescope
 Ron Bracewell – known for nulling interferometry, and the Bracewell probe concept in SETI; Lewis M. Terman Professor of Electrical Engineering, Emeritus at Stanford University
 Edwin Ernest Salpeter – Crafoord Laureate Astronomy 1997, known for the initial mass function and accretion disk model of active galactic nuclei
 Paul D. Scully-Power – first Australian-born astronaut to fly in space
 Greg Chamitoff – NASA astronaut and University of Sydney Lawrence Hargrave Professor of Aeronautical Engineering
 Philip K. Chapman – Apollo 14 Mission Scientist

Biology
 Marnie Blewitt – molecular biologist, scientist in the field of epigenetics
 Catherine King – ecotoxicologist, Antarctic researcher
 June Lascelles – microbiologist, pioneer in microbial photosynthesis
 Robert May, Baron May of Oxford – Crafoord Laureate Biosciences 1996
 Roland Stocker – scientist in the field of redox biology
 John Mattick – molecular biologist

Chemistry
 Arthur Birch
 Sir John Cornforth  – winner of the Nobel Prize for Chemistry (1975)
 Philip A. Gale
 Noel Hush  – winner of the 2007 Welch Award in Chemistry
 Alice Motion
 Elizabeth New
 Barbara H. Stuart
 Sir Robert Robinson – winner of the Nobel Prize for Chemistry (1947)
 Peter Rutledge
 Anthony Weiss – McCaughey Professor in Biochemistry and Fellow of the Royal Society of Chemistry, for discoveries on human elastic materials that accelerate the healing and repair of arteries, skin and 3D human tissue components
 Jenny Zhang

Computer scientists
 Michael Georgeff – AAAI Fellow, Director of the Australian Artificial Intelligence Institute
 Rick Jelliffe – inventor of the Schematron schema language
 Rod Johnson –  best-selling author; expert in Java/Java EE; founder of the Spring Framework
 John Lions – author of Lions' Commentary on UNIX 6th Edition, with Source Code, commonly known as the Lions Book
 Vaughan Pratt – ACM Fellow; pioneer in computer science; Professor Emeritus at Stanford University
 Ross Quinlan – AAAI Fellow; highly cited scholar and a pioneer in decision theory
 Ken Thompson– co-creator of unix; Turing Award recipient
 Andrew Tridgell – co-inventor of the rsync algorithm; author of and contributor to the Samba file server

Engineering
 Ronald Ernest Aitchison – solid-state physicist and electronics engineer
 Ronald N. Bracewell – known for nulling interferometry, and the Bracewell probe concept in SETI; Lewis M. Terman Professor of Electrical Engineering, Emeritus at Stanford University
 John Bradfield – designer of the Sydney Harbour Bridge
 Julie Cairney – materials scientist and engineer and Director of the Australian Centre for Microscopy and Microanalysis
 Graeme Clark – inventor of the bionic ear implant
 Bryan Gaensler – former associate professor of astronomy at Harvard University; ARC Federation Fellow at the University of Sydney
 Robert May, Baron May of Oxford – former Chairman of the University Research Board and Professor of Zoology at Princeton University
 John O'Sullivan – winner of 2009 Prime Minister's Prize for Science; an originator of wireless technology, credited with the invention of WiFi,
 Ruby Payne-Scott – first female radio astronomer
 David Skellern – made pioneering contributions to WIFI technology
 Richard H. Small – co-inventor of Thiele/Small parameters
 Neville Thiele – co-inventor of Thiele/Small parameters
 David Warren – inventor of the "black box" (flight data recorder)

Geology, archeology and oceanography

 Nerilie Abram – climate scientist
 Elaine Baker - marine science and environment researcher; Director of the University of Sydney Marine Studies Institute
 Stephen Bourke – archaeologist of the ancient Near East
 V. Gordon Childe – archaeologist of Prehistoric Europe
 Peter Cockcroft – petroleum geologist, researcher
 Sir Edgeworth David – geologist and Antarctic explorer
 Ove Hoegh-Guldberg – marine biologist and climate scientist
 Basil Hennessy – archaeologist of the Ancient Near East
 Sir Douglas Mawson – geologist and Antarctic explorer
 Beryl Nashar – geologist; first female PhD in geology at an Australian university (UTas); first female Dean of an Australian university
 David O'Connor – Egyptologist
 Timothy Potts – art historian, archaeologist, and museum director
 Karin Sowada – archaeologist of Egypt
 Griffith Taylor – Antarctic explorer; Professor of Geography at the University of Chicago; founder of the Geography department at the University of Toronto

Mathematics and economics

 Robert Griffiths  – Professor of Mathematical Genetics at University of Oxford
 Peter Gavin Hall – Professor of Statistics at University of California, Davis
 John Harsanyi – Nobel Memorial Prize in Economic Sciences (1994)
 Richard Holden – Professor of Economics at UNSW Business School
 Jan Kmenta – Professor Emeritus of Economics at University of Michigan
 Kelvin Lancaster – creator of the theory of the second best and "A New Approach to Consumer Theory"; John Bates Clark Professor of Economics at Columbia University
 Graeme Milton – Professor of Mathematics at University of Utah, recipient of SIAM Ralph E. Kleinman Prize and SIAM fellow
 Pat Moran – made significant contributions to probability theory and its application to population and evolutionary genetics
 Yew-Kwang Ng – economist at Monash University
 Graeme Segal  – Lowndean Professor of Astronomy and Geometry; Fellow of St John’s College, Cambridge (1990–1999)
 Eugene Seneta – co-inventor of the Variance-gamma distribution
 Trevor Swan – economist best known for his work on the Solow-Swan Model
 Justin Wolfers – economist at Pennsylvania's Wharton School of Business
 Eddie Woo – secondary school teacher and writer best known for his online mathematics lessons published on YouTube

Medicine

 George Henry Abbott – surgeon and former Fellow University of Sydney
 Katie Louisa Ardill – first woman to be appointed as a divisional surgeon in New South Wales; among the first female doctors when she joined the British Expeditionary Forces in Egypt in 1915
 Nikos Athanasou – Professor of Musculoskeletal Pathology at Oxford University and Greek-Australian novelist
 Samy Azer – Professor of Medical Education; international medical educator
 Maxwell Bennett – proved that nerve terminals on muscles release transmitter molecules, rather than just the noradrenaline and acetylcholine that were previously known
 Dame Valerie Beral (graduated with first-class honours in both medicine and surgery, 1969) – epidemiologist; Fellow of the Royal Society; Head of Cancer Epidemiology Unit at the University of Oxford and Cancer Research UK since 1989
 Ralph Beattie Blacket  – beriberi and heart disease researcher
 Grace Boelke – general practitioner; one of the first two female graduates in medicine from the University of Sydney
 Claudia Bradley  (1909–1967) – pharmacist, paediatrician, orthopaedist
 Jennifer Byrne – cancer researcher
 Janet Carr (1933–2014) – physiotherapist
 John Carter  – endocrinologist and former president Australian Diabetes Society
 Victor Chang  (1936–1991) – pioneer of modern heart transplantation
 Robert Clancy – developer of first oral vaccine for acute bronchitis
 Graeme Clark  – inventor of cochlear ear implant
 David A. Cooper  – HIV/AIDS researcher and director of the Kirby Institute
 Grace Cuthbert-Browne  – doctor and Director of Maternal and Baby Welfare in the New South Wales Department of Public Health, 1937–1964
 Raymond Dart – anatomist and anthropologist, known for his discovery in 1924 of a fossil (first ever found) of Australopithecus africanus (extinct hominid closely related to humans)
 John Diamond – developer of Behavioral Kinesiology (now called Life-Energy Analysis), a system based upon applied kinesiology, incorporating the emotions
 Anna Donald (1966–2009) – pioneer and advocate of evidence-based medicine
 Rachael Dunlop – medical researcher and sceptic
 John Dwyer  – Australian doctor, professor of medicine, and public health advocate.
 Creswell Eastman  – Endocrinologist, professor of medicine, known for Iodine Deficiency Disorders research.
 Sir John Eccles – 1963 Nobel Laureate in Medicine or Physiology "for discoveries concerning the ionic mechanisms involved in excitation and inhibition in the peripheral and central portions of the nerve cell membrane"
  Peter Green – Director of the Celiac Disease Center at Columbia University
 Sir Norman Gregg – identified rubella in early pregnancy as a human teratogen
 Sir Henry Harris  – Regius Professor of Medicine at Oxford; first demonstrated the existence of tumour-suppressing genes
 Freida Ruth Heighway (1907–1963) – obstetrician and gynaecologist
 Ken Hillman – intensive care physician
 Portia Holman – child psychiatrist
 David Hunter – Dean for Academic Affairs, Harvard School of Public Health
 John Hunter – Challis Professor of Anatomy at age 24 years whose brilliant career, achieving international recognition, was cut short by fever just two years later
 Sir Keith Jones – surgeon and former president of the Australian Medical Association
 Sir Bernard Katz – 1970 Nobel Laureate in Medicine or Physiology "for discoveries concerning the humoral transmittors in the nerve terminals and the mechanism for their storage, release and inactivation"
 Robert Kavanaugh – dentist and George Cross recipient
 Stephen W. Kuffler – "father of modern neuroscience"
 Max Lake – Australia's first specialist hand surgeon
 Gerald Lawrie – American heart surgeon and pioneer in the surgical treatment of valvular heart disease; performed the first mitral valve repair using the daVinci robotic surgical system; Methodist Hospital Michael E. Debakey Professor of Cardiac Surgery at Baylor College of Medicine
 Sir Herbert Maitland – surgeon
 William McBride – obstetrician, who in 1961 first warned the medical world against thalidomide as a human teratogen
 Charles George McDonald – physician, army officer and academic
 Patrick McGorry – Australian of the Year 2010
 Wirginia Maixner – neurosurgeon, director of neurosurgery at the Royal Children's Hospital in Melbourne; graduated in 1986
 Sir Michael Marmot – President of British Medical Association, Professor of Epidemiology and Public Health at University College London; has conducted ground-breaking studies into stroke
 John Mattick – Executive Director of the Garvan Institute of Medical Research in Sydney, whose research led to the discovery of the function of non-coding DNA
  Stan Devenish Meares – former President Australian Council Royal College of Obstetricians and Gynaecologists
 Donald Metcalf  – his research revealed the control of blood cell formation
 Errol Solomon Meyers – prominent Brisbane doctor; one of the founding fathers of the University of Queensland School of Medicine
 Jacques Miller  – discoverer of the function of the thymus (the last major organ of the human body whose function remained unknown)
 Sir William Morrow – former President Royal Australasian College of Physicians
 Philip Nitschke – physician, humanist, author, founder and director of the pro-euthanasia group Exit International
 Sir Gustav Nossal  – immunologist, discoverer of the "one cell-one antibody" rule, which states that each B lymphocyte, developed in bone marrow, secretes a specific antibody in response to an encounter with a specific foreign antigen
 Mitchell Notaras – graduate who funded the $1.1 million Mitchel J Notaras Scholarship for Colorectal Medicine at the University of Sydney
 Susie O'Reilly – family doctor and obstetrician, noted for her rejected application for residency at Sydney Hospital in favour of male applicants in 1905 despite her excellent academic record
 Brian Owler – President of the Australian Medical Association
 Cecil Purser – former chairman Royal Prince Alfred Hospital
 Margery Scott-Young – surgeon
 Colin Sullivan – inventor of the Continuous Positive Airflow Pressure (CPAP) mask
 Mavis Sweeney – hospital pharmacist
 Frank Tidswell – former Director New South Wales Government Bureau of Microbiology and Director of Pathology at the Royal Alexandra Hospital for Children
 Alan O. Trounson – President of the California Institute for Regenerative Medicine
 John Turtle – former Kellion Professor of Endocrinology University of Sydney
 Nan Waddy – psychiatrist
 Harry Windsor – heart surgeon
 Donald Wood-Smith – Professor of Clinical Surgery Columbia University New York
 Jeannette Young – medical doctor and Chief Health Officer of Queensland

Physics
 Bruce Bolt – pioneer of engineering seismology; Professor of Earth and Planetary Science at the University of California, Berkeley
 Brian O'Brien – physicist and space scientist
 Richard Dowden – noted geo- and astrophysicist
 Herbert Huppert  – Professor of Theoretical Geophysics and Foundation Director, Institute of Theoretical Geophysics, Cambridge University since 1989; Fellow of King's College, Cambridge since 1970
 Richard Makinson – physicist notable for his contributions to amorphous semiconductors
 Bernard Mills  – inventor of the Mills Cross Telescope
 Edwin Ernest Salpeter – known for his contributions to astronomy; Professor of Physics, Emeritus at Cornell University

Veterinary and agricultural scientists
 William Ian Beardmore Beveridge – Professor of Animal Pathology and Director of the Institute of Animal Pathology at Cambridge University from 1947 to 1975
 Chris Brown – veterinarian and TV presenter, most notably in the factual TV series Bondi Vet
 Sir Ian Clunies Ross – Chairman Commonwealth Scientific and Industrial Research Organisation
 Hugh McLeod Gordon – veterinary parasitologist
 Daria Nina Love – veterinary microbiologist and educator
 Gordon McClymont – agricultural scientist, ecologist, and educationist; foundation chair of the Department of Rural Science at the University of New England; originator of the term "sustainable agriculture"
 Ross Perry – Australia’s first registered avian veterinarian; first to study and name Psittacine Beak and Feather Disease, for which he was co-discoverer of viral infection agent
 Sanjaya Rajaram  – World Food Prize Laureate and the Head of Wheat Programme from 1976 to 2001 at International Maize and Wheat Improvement Centre (CIMMYT), once referred to as "the greatest present-day wheat scientist in the world" by Norman Borlaug

Sport 

 'Snowy' Baker – rugby union, diving, boxing, swimming and polo
 Nigel Barker – holder of Australia's first athletics world record, in the 
 Ken Catchpole – rugby union footballer, state and national representative half-back
 Alex Chambers – professional mixed martial artist in the UFC
 Brendon Cook – international race car driver
 Chloe Dalton  – formed part of the first female rugby 7s team to win gold at the 2016 Summer Olympics
 Caitlin De Wit – wheelchair basketball player
 Kilian Elkinson - Bermudian footballer
 Nick Farr-Jones – rugby union footballer
 Jessica Fox – French-born Australian slalom canoer, Olympic silver (K-1 slalom), world championships bronze (C-1)
 Peter Fuzes (born 1947) – association soccer player
 Scott Gourley – rugby union and rugby league
 Phil Hardcastle – rugby union footballer
 Peter Johnson – rugby player
 Tom Lawton, Snr – rugby union player
 Jack Metcalfe – whilst competing on Sydney University Oval on 14 December 1935, set a new world record in the triple jump, leaping 
 Herbert Moran – rugby union player
 Stirling Mortlock – rugby union player
 Dean Mumm – rugby union player
 Otto Nothling – rugby union and cricket player
 Ellyse Perry – cricket and football player
 Mike Pyke – rugby union player and Australian rules footballer
 Alex Ross – state and national representative rugby union player
 Kevin Ryan – rugby union and rugby league player
 John Solomon – rugby union player, state and national representative versatile back
 Johnny Taylor – rugby union and cricket player
 John Thornett – rugby union player
 Dick Tooth – rugby union footballer
 John Treloar – first Australian to reach an Olympic Games  final sprint
 Johnnie Wallace – rugby union player, state and national representative three-quarter
 Phil Waugh – rugby union footballer
 Zhao Zong-Yuan – youngest Australian to become a chess Grandmaster

Other 
 David Gulasi – Australian social media figure active in China
 Paul Hockings – anthropologist
 Margaret McArthur – anthropologist, nutritionist and educator
 Mervyn Meggitt – anthropologist
 Anne Pattel-Gray – theologian, author

Footnotes

Faculty

Administration

Chancellors
The chancellor is elected by the fellows and presides at Senate meetings. In 1924, the executive position of vice-chancellor was created, and the chancellor ceased to have managerial responsibilities. Until 1860, the chancellor was known as the provost.

Vice-Chancellors
The vice-chancellor serves as the chief executive officer of the university, and oversees most of the university's day-to-day operations, with the chancellor serving in a largely ceremonial role. Before 1924, the vice-chancellors were fellows of the university, elected annually by the fellows. Until 1860, the vice-chancellor was known as the vice-provost. Since 1955, the full title has been Vice-Chancellor and Principal.

References

Further reading
 Williams, Bruce. Liberal education and useful knowledge: a brief history of the University of Sydney, 1850–2000, Chancellor's Committee, University of Sydney, 2002. 
 Inspiring leaders at Women's College

Sydney, University of
University
University